Ahmed Evariste Medego (born 7 April 1982) is a retired football striker who played for the Chadian national team.

Career

While playing football in Cameroon, Medego was banned for one-year by the Cameroonian Football Federation for registering with two clubs simultaneously (Sable FC and Bandja FC). He moved to Gabon where he played for AS Mangasport. He scored a goal in Mangasport's 2009 CAF Champions League preliminary round upset of DC Motema Pembe. He finished his career in Gazelle FC in the Chad Premier League.

International career

Medego has made 21 appearances for the Chad national football team, and he was a part of qualifying campaign for 2006 and 2010 FIFA World Cup. He played for the side that finished runners-up at the 2005 CEMAC Cup.

References

External links

1982 births
Living people
Chadian footballers
Chad international footballers
People from N'Djamena
Gazelle FC players
Sable FC players
AS Mangasport players
Missile FC players
Association football forwards
Association football midfielders